Paul Glaister  is a British mathematician, the UK representative to the International Commission on Mathematical Instruction, and former Chair of the Joint Mathematical Council (JMC) of the United Kingdom, a body which set up the Advisory Committee on Mathematics Education along with the Royal Society, and comprises 31 bodies representing mathematics education in the UK; an External Expert for Ofqual and for the Standards and Testing Agency within the Department for Education; Honorary Secretary and a Council member of the Institute of Mathematics and its Applications; and works closely with the Education Development Trust in a number of areas in mathematics education. He is a Professor of Mathematics and Mathematics Education in the Department of Mathematics and Statistics at the University of Reading. His contributions have been across the areas of computational fluid dynamics, numerical analysis, applied mathematics, mathematics education, and science education.

Glaister was appointed Commander of the Order of the British Empire (CBE) in the 2023 New Year Honours for services to education.

References

External links
 Departmental webpage, University of Reading
 Personal webpage, University of Reading

British mathematicians
Living people
Year of birth missing (living people)
Commanders of the Order of the British Empire
Academics of the University of Reading